Hymn of the Pearl or Hymn on the Pearl may refer to:
 Hymn of the Pearl, a passage of the apocryphal Acts of Thomas, believed to be composed by the Syriac gnostic Bardaisan
 Hymns on the Pearl (Madrāšē al-Marganītā), a collection of five hymns within the larger cycle known as the Hymns on Faith, an anti-Arian cycle of hymns by Ephrem the Syrian
 Hymn o Perle, a poetry collection by Czesław Miłosz published in 1982